The retreat of the government of the Republic of China to Taiwan, also known as the Kuomintang's retreat to Taiwan or the Great Retreat in Taiwan, refers to the exodus of the remnants of the internationally recognized Kuomintang-ruled government of the Republic of China (ROC) to the island of Taiwan (Formosa) on 7 December 1949 after losing the Chinese Civil War in the mainland. The Kuomintang (Chinese Nationalist Party), its officers, and approximately 2 million ROC troops took part in the retreat, in addition to many civilians and refugees, fleeing the advance of the People's Liberation Army of the Chinese Communist Party (CCP).

In 1895, Qing China was defeated by Japan in the First Sino-Japanese War, forcing the Qing dynasty to cede Taiwan and the Pescadores to the Japanese Empire, which began its 50-year long colonial rule. As World War II ended, the ROC, which ousted the Qing in 1911, regained control of Taiwan in 1945 after the Japanese surrender and placed it under military occupation. The Chinese Civil War between the KMT and the CCP, that began in 1927, resumed in 1946. By 1948–1949, most of the mainland fell to the communists, including its national capital of Nanjing, later Guangzhou, followed by Chongqing and then Chengdu.

ROC troops mostly fled to Taiwan from provinces in southern China, in particular Sichuan Province, where the last stand of the ROC's main army took place. The flight to Taiwan took place over four months after Mao Zedong had proclaimed the founding of the People's Republic of China (PRC) in Beijing on 1 October 1949. The island of Taiwan remained part of Japan during the occupation until Japan severed its territorial claims in the Treaty of San Francisco, which came into effect in 1952.

After the retreat, the leadership of the ROC, particularly Generalissimo and President Chiang Kai-shek, planned to make the retreat only temporary, hoping to regroup, fortify, and reconquer the mainland. This plan, which never came into fruition, was known as "Project National Glory", and made the national priority of the ROC on Taiwan. Once it became apparent that such a plan could not be realized, the ROC's national focus shifted to the modernization and economic development of Taiwan. The ROC, however, continues to officially claim exclusive sovereignty over the now-CCP governed mainland China.

Background 
The Chinese Civil War between Chiang Kai-shek’s KMT forces and Mao Zedong's CCP entered its final stage in 1945, following the surrender of Japan. Both sides sought to control and unify China. While Chiang heavily relied on assistance from the United States, Mao relied on support from the Soviet Union as well as the rural population of China.

The bloody conflict between the KMT and the CCP began when both parties were attempting to subdue Chinese warlords in northern China and continued though the Second Sino-Japanese War, during which time vast portions of China fell under Japanese occupation. The need to eliminate the warlords was seen as necessary by both Mao Zedong and Chiang Kai-shek, but for different reasons. For Mao, their elimination would end the feudal system in China, encouraging and preparing the country for socialism and communism. For Chiang, the warlords were a great threat to the central government. This basic dissimilarity in motivation continued throughout the years of fighting against the Japanese invasion of China, in spite of a common enemy.

Mao's Communist forces mobilized the peasantry in rural China against the Japanese, and at the time of the Japanese surrender in 1945 the CCP had built an army of nearly a million soldiers. The pressure Mao's forces placed on the Japanese benefitted the Soviet Union, and thus the CCP forces were supplied by the Soviets. The ideological unity of the CCP, and the experience acquired in fighting the Japanese, prepared it for the next battles against the Kuomintang. Though Chiang's forces were well equipped by the US, they lacked effective leadership and political unity.

In January 1949, Chiang Kai-shek stepped down as leader of the KMT and was replaced by his vice-president, Li Zongren. Li and Mao entered into negotiations for peace, but Nationalist hardliners rejected Mao's demands. When Li sought an additional delay in mid-April 1949, the Chinese Red Army crossed the Yangtze (Chang) River. Chiang fled to the island of Formosa (Taiwan), where approximately 300,000 soldiers had already been airlifted.

Relocation of forces and people 
Over the course of 4 months beginning in August 1949, the ROC leaders relocated the Republic of China Air Force to Taiwan,  taking over 80 flights and 3 ships. Chen Chin-Chang writes in his book on the subject that an average of 50 or 60 planes flew daily between Taiwan and China transporting fuel and ammunition between August 1949 and December 1949.

Chiang also sent the 26 naval vessels of the Nationalist army to Taiwan. The final Communist assault against Nationalist forces began on 20 April 1949 and continued until the end of summer.  By August, the People's Liberation Army dominated almost all of mainland China; the Nationalists held only Taiwan and the Pescadores Islands, some parts of Kwangtung, Fukien, Chekiang and a few regions in China's far west.

Institute of History and Philology director Fu Ssu-nien spearheaded a rush to persuade scholars to flee to Taiwan, as well as bringing books and documents.

In total, according to current estimates, a migration of between 900,000 and 1,100,000 people must have taken place to Taiwan from the Chinese mainland between 1945 and 1955. The prior population of the island, at the end of Japanese rule, is estimated as 6,500,000 (see also Population of Taiwan). Of these, the Japanese subpopulation of about 500,000 were mostly repatriated by 1946. The number of immigrants is not known for certain, however, since no precise census was made before or during Japanese rule. The census of 1956 counts 640,000 civilian migrants from the mainland. The size of the army was secret at the time. Taiwanese documents found much later count 580,000 soldiers. American contemporary intelligence, however, put the number at only 450,000. Additionally, some army personnel were discharged before 1956 and are therefore (or for other reasons) included in both numbers, while others were drafted locally and were not immigrants. Such considerations led scholars to the above estimate. It is noted that upper estimates of up to two or three million immigrants are commonly found in older publications. Immigration on a similar scale took place in Hong Kong at the time.

Relocating treasures from the mainland 

In 1948, Chiang Kai-shek began planning the KMT retreat to Taiwan with a plan to take gold and treasure from the mainland. The amount of gold that was moved differs according to sources, but it is usually estimated as between three million to five million taels (approximately 113.6-115.2 tons; one tael is 31.25 grams). Other than gold, KMT brought artifacts, which are kept mostly in the National Palace Museum in Taipei, Taiwan. Some scholars say the movement of gold and treasure was one of a number of protective measures against the Japanese invasion and occupation, similar to how European governments transferred gold to other locations during World War II.

Chiang Kai-shek's mission to take gold from China was held secretly because, according to Dr Wu Sing-yung, the entire mission was operated by Chiang himself. Only Chiang and Dr Wu's father, who was the head of Military Finance for the KMT government, knew about the expenditure and moving of gold to Taiwan and almost all orders by Chiang were issued verbally. Dr Wu stated that even the finance minister had no power over the final expenditure and transfer. The written record was kept as the top military secret by Chiang in the Taipei Presidential Palace and the declassified archives only became available to the public more than 40 years after his death in April 1975. It is a widely held belief that the gold brought to Taiwan were used to lay foundations for the Taiwanese economy and government. Some also believe that after six months of the gold operation by Chiang, the New Taiwanese dollar was launched, which replaced the old Taiwanese dollar at a ratio of one to 40,000. It is believed that 800,000 taels of gold were used to stabilize the economy which had been suffering from hyperinflation since 1945. However, these beliefs turned out to be mistaken. According to a memoir written by Zhou Hong-tao, a long-term aide-de-camp of Chiang, the gold was consumed very fast after being brought to Taiwan and in less than two years 80% was already consumed for the funds and provisions for the troops.

The National Palace Museum claims that in 1948 when China was going through its Civil War, executive director Chu Chia-hua and others (Wang Shijie, Fu Ssu-nien, Xu Hong-Bao, Li Ji, and Han Lih-wu) discussed shipping masterpieces to Taiwan for the artifacts' safety. There are different opinions on treasures that are at Taiwan's National Palace Museum. Some in China view the relocation as looting. Others believe these treasures have been accidentally protected, and might have been lost forever due to the Four Olds campaign during the Cultural Revolution. Many historians believe that the treasure was taken to Taiwan by the Nationalists to keep it safe from the CCP. Others believe that Taiwan is still part of Chinese sovereign territory so the relocation is not an issue.

Immediate ROC military actions 
From Taiwan, Chiang's air force attempted to bomb the mainland cities of Shanghai and Nanking, but to no effect. Chiang's ground forces aimed to return to the mainland, but had no long-term success. Thus Mao Zedong's Communist forces were left in control of all of China except Hainan Island and Taiwan.

As a whole, the Civil War had an immense impact on the Chinese people. The historian Jonathan Fenby proposes that “hyperinflation [during the Chinese Civil War] undermined everyday lives and ruined tens of millions, hampered by a poor taxation base, increased military spending and widespread corruption."

Plans to retake mainland China 

Originally, the Republic of China planned to reconquer the mainland from the People's Republic. After the retreat to Taiwan, Chiang Kai-shek established a dictatorship over the island with other Nationalist leaders, and began making plans to invade the mainland.  Chiang conceived a top secret plan called Project National Glory or Project Guoguang, to accomplish this.  Chiang's planned offensive involved 26 operations including land invasions and special operations behind enemy lines.  He had asked his son Chiang Ching-kuo to draft a plan for air raids on the provinces of Fujian and Guangdong, from where many ROC soldiers and much of the population of Taiwan had origins.  If it had taken place, it would have been the largest seaborne invasion in history.

Context of Project National Glory 
The 1960s saw Mao Zedong's so-called "Great Leap Forward" in mainland China lead to catastrophic famines and millions of deaths, as well as progress by the PRC towards possible development of nuclear weapons. Thus, Chiang Kai-shek saw a crisis-opportunity to launch an attack to reclaim mainland China.

At this time, the U.S. was fighting the Vietnam War. For Project National Glory to be successful Chiang Kai-shek knew he needed US military assistance.  Thus he offered to help the Americans fight the Vietnam War in exchange for U.S. support conducive to take back his lost territory. The U.S. opposed and refused Chiang's suggestions.  This did not stop him. Rather, Chiang went ahead with the preparations and continued to further his plan to take back their lost territory.

In 1965, Chiang's plans to strike were completed. His generals and admirals planned possible dates to deploy while soldiers and field officers prepared for battle, according to the government archives.

Chronology 
1 April 1961:  The year witnessed the advent of the Project National Glory. The office was built by the Republic of China Armed Forces together with the Ministry of National Defense in the town of Sanxia, Taipei County (now a district in New Taipei City).  Army Lieutenant General Zhu Yuancong took the role of governor and officially launched the project to compose a prudent plan of operations to recover the lost territories in mainland China. At the same time, the establishment of  came to light whereby military members began to work out a possible alliance with American troops to attack mainland China.

April 1964:  During this year, Chiang Kai-shek arranged an ensemble of air-raid shelters and five military offices at Lake Cihu, which served as a secret command centre. Following the establishment of Project National Glory, several sub-plans were put into place, such as the frontal area of the enemy, rear area special warfare, surprise attack, take advantage of the counterattack, and assistance against tyranny.

However, the United States Armed Forces and the U.S. Department of Defense, together with the State Department, strongly opposed Project National Glory; rejecting the KMT plan to retake mainland China. Thus, every week American troops checked the inventory of Republic of China Marine Corps amphibious landing vehicles used by ROC and ordered American military advisory group members to fly over the Project National Glory camp on scouting missions. These flyovers infuriated Chiang Kai-Shek.

17 June 1965:  Chiang Kai-shek visited the Republic of China Military Academy to convene with all mid level and higher officers to devise and launch the counterattack.

24 June 1965:  A multitude of soldiers died during a training drill to feign a Communist attack on major naval bases in southern Taiwan near Zuoying District. The deaths that occurred during the happening were the first but not the last in Project National Glory.

6 August 1965:  A People's Liberation Army Navy torpedo boat ambushed and drowned 200 soldiers as the Zhangjiang naval warship carried out assignment Tsunami Number 1, in an attempt to transport special forces to the vicinity of the Eastern mainland Chinese coastal island of Dongshan to carry out an intelligence gathering operation.

November 1965:  Chiang Kai-shek ordered two other naval vessels, the CNS Shan Hai and the CNS Lin Huai to pick up injured soldiers from Taiwan's offshore islands of Magong and Wuqiu. The vessels were attacked by 12 PRC ships, the Lin Huai sunk, and roughly 90 soldiers and sailors were killed in action. Surprised by the heavy loss of life in the naval battle at Magong, Chiang gave up all hope for Project National Glory.

After several unsuccessful feigned invasions between August 1971 and June 1973, in the lead up to the main landings, the 1973 coup which witnessed Nie Rongzhen's rise to power in Beijing drove Chiang to call off all further false attacks and commence full landing operations. Having said this, according to General Huang Chih-chung, who was an army colonel at the time and part of the planning process, Chiang Kai-shek never completely gave up the desire to recapture China; "even when he died (in 1975), he was still hoping the international situation would change and that the Communists would be wiped out one day."

Failure and shift of focus to modernization 
The failure of Chiang's Project National Glory changed the course of Chinese and Taiwanese history, forever altering cross-strait relations. For example, the Taiwanese “shifted the focus to modernizing and defending Taiwan instead of preparing Taiwan to take back China,” stated Andrew Yang, a political scientist specializing in Taiwan-Mainland China relations at the Taipei-based Council of Advanced Policy Studies. Chiang Kai-shek's son Chiang Ching-kuo, who later succeeded him as president, focused on maintaining peace between the mainland and Taiwan. Today, political relations between Taiwan and China have changed; as General Huang said, "I hope it will develop peacefully... There's no need for war."

Reform of the Kuomintang 
After being expelled from the mainland, Chiang Kai-shek and other KMT leaders realized they had to  reform the party.

Reinventing a new political party 

In late 1949, having been almost destroyed by the Chinese Communists, the Kuomintang relocated to Taiwan and reinvented itself. Not only did the KMT leadership build a new party, but it built a new polity on Taiwan that created economic prosperity. From August 1950 to October 1952, more than four hundred working meetings were held almost four times a week to discuss how to build a new political party and implement Nationalist government policies. On August 5, 1950, Chiang chose the Central Reform Committee (CRC) to serve as the party's core leadership for planning and acting. The CRC members had an average age of 47 and all had college degrees.

The new CRC had six goals.

 Make the KMT a revolutionary democratic party.
 Recruit peasants, workers, youth, intellectuals, and capitalists.
 Adhere to democratic centralism.
 Establish the work team as the basic organizational unit.
 Maintain high standards of leadership and obey the party's decisions,
 Adopt Dr. Sun Yat-sen’s Three Principles of the People as the KMT's ideology.

All CRC members took an oath to fulfill the party's ultimate goals which is to get rid of the Communists and recover the Chinese mainland.

Expanding the Party's social foundation 
Having organized a cohesive, loyal party, Chiang Kai-shek wanted to extend its influence deep into Taiwan's society in order to broaden its social base. One way to do that was to select new members from different socioeconomic groups. Various party branch members were ordered to recruit new members, especially students and teachers. New members had to show loyalty to the KMT party, understand what the party represented, obey party principles, and perform services for the party. In return, the CRC promised to pay attention to society's needs, which helped the CRC define a clear political purpose. Party policy also targeted ways to improve ordinary people's living conditions. Having new party branches made up of people of similar social status was a strategy that improved relations with workers, business leaders, farmers, and intellectuals. With the new party branches promoting the various groups of people, the KMT was able slowly to extend its control and influence into Taiwan's villages. By October 1952, KMT membership had reached nearly 282,000, compared to the 50,000 members who had fled to Taiwan. More significant, more than half the party members were Taiwanese. By the late 1960s, this number had risen to nearly one million.

CRC made its work teams responsible for enforcing party policies and informing members how to behave. They also prevented communist infiltration, and recruited new party members after investigating their backgrounds, in order to hold regular meetings to discuss party strategy. The new party, then, behaved very differently from the way it had before 1949, with its work teams having new managerial and training responsibilities. According to the KMT's new rules, all party members had to join a work team and attend its meetings so that the party leadership could discover who was loyal and active. According to one report, in the summer of 1952, the KMT's Taiwan provincial party headquarters had at least 30,000 work-team units in the field, each unit having at least nine members who worked in various state agencies, areas of Taiwan, and occupations. Gradually, the party expanded its influence in society and in the state.

Local political reforms 
An important KMT tactic was to promote limited, local-level political reforms to enhance the party's authority with the Taiwanese people. To legitimize the Republic of China (ROC) as the central government for all China, Taiwan's Nationalist government needed elected representatives for all China. Thus, in 1947 more than one thousand mainlanders in Nanking were elected by the Chinese people as members of the National Assembly, Legislative Yuan, and the Control Yuan. After coming to Taiwan, those representatives were permitted to hold their seats until the next ROC election could be held on the mainland, thus legitimizing the ROC's control of Taiwan.

In this new political environment, the reformed KMT and the ROC government were able to propose their new power. Chiang Kai-shek believed that, in this authoritarian polity, local elections could promote Taiwan's eventual democracy. People did not believe that the KMT would ever not interfere with such elections. However, having so many local elections in a year, many voters became convinced that the KMT wanted to advance political pluralism. Party leaders tried to broaden their influence, while only slowly allowing opposing politicians to compete, by giving political lessons to teach voters how democracy should work.

In January 1951, the first elections for county and city council were held. In April, other elections followed for county and municipal offices. In December 1951, the Taiwan Provisional Provincial Assembly was organized. Its members were appointed by county and municipal assemblies. Through martial law and the control of local election rules, the KMT won most of those local elections but claimed that free elections had been held. Chiang believed that enough liberty had been granted. Therefore, party leaders continued to emphasize that martial law was still necessary.

The new approach of the party also extended to its approach to education. Initially, the party had seen public schools as a necessary instrument of assimilation and nation-building. Private schools, seen as unwanted competition, were therefore suppressed. However, as education needs on the island began to outstrip government resources, the party reevaluated their approach. Starting in 1954, private schools were not only tolerated, but backed by state funding. Simultaneously, steps were taken to secure the obedience of private schools, such as ensuring the placement of party loyalists on school boards and the passing of strict laws to control the political content of the curricula.

Views on the legality of the KMT takeover of Taiwan 
There are opposing views on the legality of the KMT takeover of Taiwan. The Chinese Communist government maintains to this day that Taiwan is a province that must eventually return to rule by the mainland.

According to an article published in 1955 on the legal status of Taiwan, "It has been charged that Chiang Kai-shek has no claim to the island because he is 'merely a fugitive quartering his army' there and besides, his is a government in exile." Moreover, the Treaty of San Francisco, which was officially signed by 48 nations on 8 September 1951, did not specify to whom Japan was ceding Taiwan and the Pescadores. Despite this, the ROC was viewed by the vast majority of states at the time as the legitimate representative of China, as it had succeeded the Qing Dynasty, while the PRC was at the time a mostly unrecognized state. Japan was, at the time of the signing of the Treaty of San Francisco, still technically under American occupation. After full independence, Japan established full relations with the ROC and not the PRC.

According to Professor Gene Hsiao, "since the San Francisco Peace Treaty and the separate KMT treaty with Japan did not specify to whom Japan was ceding Taiwan and the Pescadores, the implication of the U.S. position was that legally, and insofar as the signatories of those two treaties were concerned, Taiwan became an 'ownerless' island and the KMT, by its own assent to the American policy, a foreign government-in-exile."

See also 
 Xi'an Incident
 Yan Xishan
 Chiang Ching-kuo
 Lee Teng-hui
 Conservatism in Taiwan
 Wu Sing-yung
 Two Chinas
 China and the United Nations
 United Nations General Assembly Resolution 2758
 Proclamation of the People's Republic of China

References 
 Citations
  8.

Further reading 
 Westad, Odd Arne. Restless empire: China and the world since 1750 (2012) Online free to borrow

Kuomintang
1949 in Taiwan
1949 in China
Chinese Civil War
Evacuations
December 1949 events in Asia